is a Japanese comedian and radio personality.

Moriwaki is represented with Shochiku Geino. He graduated from Hirakata Municipal Tonoyama First Elementary School, Hirakata Municipal First Junior High School, Rakuminami High School, and Momoyama Gakuin University. Moriwaki is a resident of Kyoto. In 2010 he became the Special Advisor to Kyoto Miyama High School. Moriwaki is now married and has one son and daughter.

Biography
During high school Moriwaki held a number of voluntary planning events in the local live house Blow Down in Hirakata.

He passed the 1st Shochiuku Geino Tarento Audition during his second year in senior high school. In the 17 March 1984 Moriwaki joins Shochiku Geino and later in June he debuted in a vaudeville show. Later he became an apprentice to Hayato Wakai. In 1988 Moriwaki and Wakai turn into a duo in Zamaa Kankan! and the Kansai Local programme Kenji Moriwaki no Seishun Vegetable in the Kinki area.

Later in the 1990s he appeared in dramas and presenting variety programmes and he stepped down from Waratte Iitomo! and later became a presenter in Yume ga Mori Mori, but the programme didn't air nationwide and in 1999 the series returned in the Kinki area.

Current appearances

TV series

Radio

Internet series

Essays

Magazines

Advertisements

Former appearances

Variety series

TV drama

Films

Radio

Advertisements

VHS

DVD

CD

Books

Magazines

References

External links
 

Japanese comedians
Japanese radio personalities
1967 births
Living people
People from Hirakata